Heyran Khanim was an Azerbaijani poet who lived in the first half of the 19th century.

Biography
Khanim was born in Nakhchivan into an aristocratic family. Her birth and death dates are unknown. Heyran Khanim moved to Iran in the beginning of the 19th century and lived in Tabriz until the end of her life. She knew Persian and Arabic languages and learned classical literature of the East.

Khanim wrote lyrical poems of various forms, including ghazals, mukhammasses, ruba'is, and gasidas in Azerbaijani and Persian languages.

Ardent, kind and selfless love is the main theme of her poetry. In some of her poems, she blames life, protests against evil and social unfairness, violation of rights and oppressed situation of women.

References

Literature
 Aziza Jafarzade. Azərbaycanın aşıq və şair qadınları. Baku: Ganjlik, 1991, page.35.

Azerbaijani-language women poets
Azerbaijani-language poets
1790 births
1848 deaths
People from Nakhchivan
Azerbaijani emigrants to Iran
Persian-language women poets
Persian-language poets
19th-century Azerbaijani women writers
19th-century Azerbaijani writers